Cryphalus is a genus of typical bark beetles in the family Curculionidae. There are at least 5 described species in Cryphalus. The Catalogue of Life lists more than 290 provisionally accepted species, although these may be primarily synonyms of other species.

Species
These five species belong to the genus Cryphalus:
 Cryphalus abietis Ratzeburg, 1837 c g
 Cryphalus pubescens Hopkins, 1915 i c b
 Cryphalus rubentis Hopkins, 1915 i c
 Cryphalus ruficollis Hopkins, 1915 i c b
 Cryphalus sylvicola (Perkins, 1900) i c
Data sources: i = ITIS, c = Catalogue of Life, g = GBIF, b = Bugguide.net

References

Further reading

External links

 

Scolytinae